Common rock crab may refer to any of the following species of crab:
Cancer irroratus
Hemigrapsus sexdentatus
Romaleon antennarium (formerly Cancer antennarius)

See also 
 Red rock crab (disambiguation)

Animal common name disambiguation pages